Dame Ethel Mary Reader Shakespear  (née Wood; 17 July 1871 – 17 January 1946) was an English geologist, Justice of the Peace, public servant, and philanthropist. She is most famously known for her work on the Lower Ludlow Formation and won several awards for her influential papers.

Early life and education
Shakespear was born in Biddenham, Bedfordshire, the youngest daughter of the Reverend Henry Wood. She was educated at Bedford High School for Girls and Newnham College, Cambridge (1891–95), graduating in natural sciences. While at Cambridge, she was introduced to the work of John Edward Marr and Thomas McKenny Hughes. There, she was able to attend the geologic field outings alongside Hughes. During her time at Newnham College, she played tennis, took piano lessons, and became involved in Liberal politics, and it was here that she met her lifelong friend and collaborator Gertrude Elles.

Career
She studied rocks with Elles as one of their first joint projects in the Lake District. These studies were suggested by one of her previous professors, Marr. She continued her research alongside Elles, specifically on ancient rocks of the Welsh Borderlands as a research student at Newnham College.

In 1896, she became assistant to Charles Lapworth at Mason College (which later became the University of Birmingham).

In 1906, she earned her DSc from the University of Birmingham. Despite success in her field, she left her job with Lapworth in 1906 when she married Gilbert Arden Shakespear, a physics lecturer at the university whom she had met in Cambridge. However, she did remain as an associate of Newnham College for fifteen years. Despite encouragement to return to her field by her peers, she was unable due to her social work.

Throughout most of her later life, Shakespear was involved with the study of graptolite in North Wales and around the Welsh Borderland area. Her monograph was to become a standard paleontological reference work for many years.

Papers
In 1900, Shakespear published a paper on the Ludlow Formation, entitled  "The Lower Ludlow Formation and its Graptolite Fauna" in the Journal of the Geological Society. It outlined how geologists can use the fauna to classify the mudstones found in the area.

Her famous research paper The graptolites of the Lower Ludlow Shales surrounding the Ludlow Group was published before her marriage in 1906. Her research on the Lower Ludlow Shales suggests a large number of fossils to be found in this section. The most famous of fossils found in this region was Cyathaspis, the oldest British vertebrate.

With Lapworth and Elles, she published a paper on the biostratigraphy of the area from 1901 to 1914 entitled British Graptolites. She was particularly responsible for the illustrations. This monograph was to become a standard palaeontological reference work for many years.

In collaboration with her husband, Gilbert Arden Shakespear, "The Tarannon Series of Tarannon" was published in the Geological Magazine in 1906. This was the final work published before her death.

Other work
During the First World War, she devoted herself to helping disabled servicemen. She was honorary secretary of the Birmingham War Pensions Committee and from 1917 to 1926 sat on the Special Grants Committee of the Ministry of Pensions.

She was appointed a justice of the peace for Birmingham in 1922, specialising in cases involving children and working-class girls. She was a family visitor for foster parents and invited many poor women and girls to stay in her home at Caldwell Hall, Upton Warren, Worcestershire.

Honours and awards
In recognition of her work on the paper, "The Lower Ludlow Formation and its Graptolite Fauna", she was awarded the Wollaston Fund in 1904. In 1920, she received the Murchison Medal for her work on British Graptolites.

Shakespear was appointed Member of the Order of the British Empire (MBE) in 1918 for her war work and Dame Commander of the Order of the British Empire (DBE) in the 1920 civilian war honours for her work with the Birmingham War Pensions Committee.

Personal life
Ethel and Gilbert had one child, a daughter, who died in infancy.

Shakespear died of cancer in 1946, aged 74.

Footnotes

1871 births
1946 deaths
People from Biddenham
People educated at Bedford High School, Bedfordshire
Alumni of Newnham College, Cambridge
Alumni of the University of Birmingham
Deaths from cancer in England
English women geologists
English palaeontologists
English philanthropists
Dames Commander of the Order of the British Empire
British women in World War I
20th-century British women scientists
20th-century English women
20th-century English people